Sengattuppatti is a panchayat under Thuraiyur Union in Tiruchirappalli district in the Indian state of Tamil Nadu. Sengattuppatti is one of the biggest villages in Thuraiyur Union with a population of 5,914 as per 2011 census. The village is surrounded by Pachaimalai Hills on the eastern and northern sides.

 

Villages in Tiruchirappalli district